Bernard Rebel (6 October 1901, Poland – 30 September 1964, London, England) was a Polish-born British actor. His work included the role of Wormtongue in the 1955-56 BBC radio version of The Lord of the Rings.

Selected filmography
 Crook's Tour (1942) - Klacken
 The Big Blockade (1942) - Quisling
 Anna Karenina (1948) - Prof. Leverrin (uncredited)
 The Bad Lord Byron (1949) - Dr. Bruno
 Chance of a Lifetime (1950) - Xenobian
 Song of Paris (1952) - Lebrun
 Top Secret (1952) - Trubiev
 Moulin Rouge (1952) - Playwright (uncredited)
 The Captain's Paradise (1953) - Mr. Wheeler
 Wheel of Fate (1953)
 Laughing Anne (1953) - Pianist
 Twist of Fate (1954) - Engraver (uncredited)
 The Young Lovers (1954) - Stefan
 Little Red Monkey (1955) - Vinson - Spy Henchman
 1984 (1956) - Kalador (uncredited)
 It's a Wonderful World (1956) - Frenchman
 Orders to Kill (1958) - (uncredited)
 Mark of the Phoenix (1958) - Vachek
 The Rebel (1961) - Art Dealer
 The Curse of the Mummy's Tomb (1964) - Prof. Eugene Dubois (uncredited)

References

External links

1901 births
1964 deaths
Polish emigrants to the United Kingdom
British male film actors
British male television actors
20th-century British male actors